The 2017 New Zealand Warriors season was the 23rd season in the club's history. Coached by Stephen Kearney and captained by Roger Tuivasa-Sheck, the Warriors competed in the National Rugby League's 2017 Telstra Premiership. They also competed in the 2017 NRL Auckland Nines tournament.

Milestones

12 September 2016: Stephen Kearney is appointed as head coach, with former coach Andrew McFadden accepting a role as assistant coach.
14 December 2016: Sam Lisone is named in the World All Stars side to play in the 2017 All Stars match.
1 February: Roger Tuivasa-Sheck is announced as the new captain, with Simon Mannering as vice-captain.
5 March – round one: Isaiah Papalii made his NRL debut.
10 March – round two: Erin Clark made his NRL debut. Shaun Johnson scored a try and kicked two goals, surpassing Stacey Jones' 674 points as the highest point scorer for the Warriors.
26 March – round four: Simon Mannering played his 262nd match for the Warriors, surpassing Stacey Jones record for most appearances for the club.
2 April – round five: Kieran Foran made his club debut and Solomone Kata played in his 50th match for the club.
15 April – round seven: Blake Ayshford played in his 150th NRL match.
30 April – round nine: Charnze Nicoll-Klokstad made his NRL debut. The Warriors NRL community ambassador, Georgia Hale, played for the Kiwi Ferns.
5 May: Roger Tuivasa-Sheck, Kieran Foran, Shaun Johnson, Issac Luke and Simon Mannering represented New Zealand in the Anzac test. Chanel Harris-Tavita, Erin Clark and Isaiah Papali'i played for the Junior Kiwis.
6 May: In the Pacific tests: Manu Vatuvei, Tuimoala Lolohea and Mafoa'aeata Hingano represented Tonga, Ken Maumalo represented Samoa, and Charnze Nicoll-Klokstad represented the Cook Islands. 
7 May: Matt Allwood and Toafofoa Sipley represented NSW Residents.
13 May – round ten: Roger Tuivasa-Sheck played in his 100th NRL match and Sam Lisone played in his 50th, all for the Warriors.
 19 May – round eleven: Ben Matulino played in his 200th NRL match, all for the Warriors.
30 May: Jacob Lillyman played for Queensland in game one of the 2017 State of Origin series.
10 June – round fourteen: Ryan Hoffman played in his 300th NRL match.
22 July – round twenty: Chris Satae made his NRL debut.
28 July – round twenty one: James Bell made his NRL debut.
October–December: At the 2017 Rugby League World Cup: Shaun Johnson, Simon Mannering and Roger Tuivasa-Sheck represented New Zealand; Bunty Afoa, Sam Lisone, Ken Maumalo and Jazz Tevaga represented Samoa; James Bell represented Scotland; David Fusitu'a, Ata Hingano, and Solomone Kata represented Tonga; and Bureta Faraimo represented the United States.

Jersey and sponsors

Fixtures

Pre-season training
Pre-season training began on 1 November, with the exception of players involved in the 2016 Four Nations tournament.

Auckland Nines

The Warriors lost all three of their matches at the Nines.

The squad for the Nines was Ryan Hoffman, Junior Pauga, Matt Allwood, Blake Ayshford, Ata Hingano, Sam Cook, Shaun Johnson, Ruben Wiki (c), Mason Lino, Bunty Afoa, James Gavet, Tuimoala Lolohea, Jazz Tevaga, Ofahiki Ogden, Lewis Soosemea, Toafofoa Sipley, Isaiah Papalii, and James Bell. Solomone Kata was originally named, but withdrew due to a virus and was replaced by Cook.

Pre-season matches
The Warriors played two trial matches, against the Melbourne Storm and the Gold Coast Titans. The match against the Titans was in Palmerston North, it was the first time the Warriors played in Palmerston North since 1995.

Regular season

Home matches were played at Mount Smart Stadium in Auckland, with the exception of one game at Waikato Stadium in Hamilton. The Warriors also played an away game at Forsyth Barr Stadium in Dunedin.

Ladder

Squad

Staff

Head office staff
Managing Director: Jim Doyle
Media and communications manager: Richard Becht
Football operations manager: Dan Floyd
Team manager: Laurie Hale
Head of medical services: John Mayhew
Recruitment and development manager: Tony Iro
Welfare and education manager: Jerry Seuseu

Coaching staff
NRL head coach: Stephen Kearney
NRL assistant coach: Andrew McFadden
NRL assistant coach: Stacey Jones
NRL assistant coach: Steve McNamara
NSW Cup head coach: Ricky Henry
NSW Cup assistant coach: Jerome Ropati
NYC head coach: Grant Pocklington
NYC assistant coach: Boycie Nelson

Transfers

Other teams

As in 2016, the Warriors entered a team into the Intrust Super Premiership NSW and the Junior Warriors competed in the Holden Cup.

Intrust Super Premiership NSW squad

The Warriors finished the season second and played the third placed Penrith Panthers in week one of the finals. After losing to eventual winners Penrith they defeated Newcastle 30–6 before losing to the Wyong Roos in a preliminary final to end the season.

Bureta Faraimo, Mason Lino and Toafofoa Sipley were named in the 2017 Intrust Super Premiership NSW Team of the Year.

Finals

Holden Cup squad

The Holden Cup team finished in last place, with only three wins during the season. This was the final year of the Holden Cup.

Awards
Captain Roger Tuivasa-Sheck won the club's NRL player of the year award while Simon Mannering won the people's choice award.

Mason Lino was the club's Intrust Super Premiership NSW player of the year while Chanel Harris-Tavita was the NYC player of the year.

Charnze Nicoll-Klokstad won the clubman of the year while Sam Cook was the Intrust Super Premiership NSW team man of the year and Kenese Kenese was the NYC clubman of the year.

Bunty Afoa won the NRL rookie of the year and Tyler Slade was the NYC rookie of the year.

References

External links
Warriors 2017 season rugby league project

New Zealand Warriors seasons
New Zealand Warriors season
Warriors season